The City of Calgary has a number of bridges, spanning the two main rivers that cross the city, Bow River and Elbow River, as well as some other geographical and physical features.

The first building in Calgary was erected in 1872 by Alexis Cardinal, at the request of Fr Constantine Scollen, an Oblate missionary priest, at the confluence of the two rivers.

Crossings

Bow River (west of downtown)

The Bow River enters the city from west, winds around downtown, then runs south. From west to south, the following structures cross the river.

Bow River (downtown)

Bow River (south of downtown)

Elbow River

The Elbow River enters the city in the southwest, then turns north and merges into the Bow River immediately east of downtown. From west to north, the following structures cross the river.

Fish Creek

Fish Creek flows from west to east in the south part of the city, through the Fish Creek Provincial Park. It merges into the Bow River in the southeast quadrant of the city.

See also
 List of bridges in Canada

References

External link

Calgary
Bridges
Calgary